Saint Cleopatra (died 319 or 327) was a Christian saint who lived between the 3rd century and 4th century. She is venerated in the Catholic Church, Oriental Orthodoxy and Eastern Orthodoxy.

Cleopatra originally came from a village called Edra near Mount Tabor in Lower Galilee.

She was a contemporary of the holy martyr Saint Varus and had witnessed his suffering and execution. After Varus' death, Cleopatra had his remains taken to her home in Daraa, Syria where she had them buried with reverence.

Cleopatra was a widow, whose only child, was a son named John. By 319, John had attained the officer rank of centurion, but to her great sorrow, had died suddenly. Cleopatra, in grief, turned to the relics of Saint Varus, begging the saint to return her son. She dreamt that Varus and John appeared to her as radiant in bright attire with crowns upon their heads and took this to mean that the Lord had received John into the Heavenly Kingdom, and was comforted.

She moved to live by the church that she had built over the relics of Saint Varus and her son. Miracles were reported by people who had come to pray at the church. Cleopatra spent her remaining years in the service of God. She gave her property to the poor and spent her time praying and fasting. She died in 327.

Apart from Cleopatra, her son John is also recognised as a saint in Orthodox Christianity. The feast day of Saints Cleopatra and John is 19 October.

References

External links 
A Greek Orthodox Icon of Saint Cleopatra

327 deaths
4th-century Christian saints
Eastern Orthodox saints
Saints from the Holy Land
Year of birth unknown